Kirvi is a mountain in Suðuroy, near the village Lopra. Kirvi is 236m high and its shape resembles that of a pyramid. The mountain is visible from the villages Lopra. The top of the mountain is called Kirviskollur. The mountain is located in the municipality of Sumba.

Gallery

References

External links 
 Visitsuduroy.fo, The Tourist Information Center
 Sumba.fo, The municipality of Sumba (Faroe Islands).

Mountains of the Faroe Islands
Suðuroy